Machik is a U.S.-based non-profit, non-governmental organisation whose mission is to grow a global community committed to a stronger future for Tibet. Their work focuses primarily on civic engagement, gender equity and social innovation.

Background
Machik was co-founded by Tibetan sisters Losang and Tashi Rabgey, two Ph.D.s who were raised in Canada. The group came about after the sisters and their parents built the Ruth Walter Chungba Primary School in the rural village of Chungba, located in the mountains of the Kham region of Tibet.  The bilingual school first opened in 2002, and is now considered an exemplary school in the region. The organisation has also gone on to develop the Chungba Middle School and to support the students through high school and university.  They also created programs to offer educational opportunities for Tibetan girls and women in the Amdo region and created the unique Summer Enrichment Program for students from across Tibet. Other service projects have included bringing green energy and clean drinking water to a rural town, building a library in town with high literacy but low access to materials, creating a greenhouse, repairing roads and houses, and participating in health care initiatives.

Losang and Tashi Rabgey were born in a Tibetan refugee settlement in India and later moved to Canada where they both graduated from the University of Toronto. Losang was the first Commonwealth Scholar of Tibetan descent and holds a Ph.D. from the University of London's School of Oriental and African Studies and was named an explorer by both National Geographic and the Explorers Club. Tashi was the first Rhodes Scholar of Tibetan descent, her LLB is from Oxford University, LLM is from Cambridge University and holds a Ph.D. from Harvard University.  She is now a Research Professor of International Affairs at the Elliott School of International Affairs at George Washington University.  Tashi has published extensively on Tibet issues and continue to do research on the region.

Work
The work of Machik has grown from their first school to include much broader initiatives. Their approach to making an impact has centered on community-based approaches and direct interventions. Machik centers the innovative and impactful capacity of change-makers inside Tibet and is a bridge between Tibetans in Tibet and the global.  Current programs include Machik Weekend, Machik Khabda, Machik Gender Summit, and more. 
 
Machik has been able to achieve success in their programs without the political pitfalls that organisations have faced. Machik's staff speak both Mandarin Chinese and Tibetan, and their educational efforts in the U.S. emphasize an understanding of Tibet within the broader system of international affairs, including Chinese governance.

References

Charities based in Washington, D.C.
Health in Tibet
Foreign charities operating in Tibet
Education in Tibet
Kham